Armin Sinančević (born 14 August 1996) is a Serbian shot putter.

Career

2019
Sinančević competed in the men's shot put event at the World Athletics Championships held in Doha, Qatar. He progressed to the final with then-personal best of 21.51 m, but failed to record a mark in the final.

2021
Sinančević finished in 6th place in the men's shot put event at the European Athletics Indoor Championships held in Toruń, Poland.

In a Diamond League meeting in Doha in late May, he tied his own recently set national record of 21.88 m. It was the longest shot in the event, but he finished in third place under new "Final Three" format, where the three leading competitors through five rounds qualify for the sixth round, which is then solely used to determine the final ranking of the top three. Sinančević threw over 22 m in the final round, but his shot was ruled invalid.

In June, he finished second in a Diamond League Meet in Florence with a throw of 20.93 m in the decisive last-round, while his best shot of 21.60 m which was achieved in the fourth round was also second-best in the event.

He qualified to represent Serbia at the 2020 Summer Olympics in Tokyo, Japan. He finished the competition in 7th place in shot put final, where American Ryan Crouser broke olympic record three times.

In September, with old rules back in place, Sinančević took third place in Diamond League Final in Zürich with a shot of 21.86 m in the fifth round to finish ahead of Tom Walsh.

2022
Sinančević won the men's shot put event at the 2022 Mediterranean Games, setting new Games record with 21.29 m. He finished second at the European Athletics Championships in Munich  with a throw of 21.39m.

International competitions

Personal bests
Outdoor
 Shot put – 21.88 m (Bar 2021, Doha 2021) NR
Indoor
 Shot put – 21.25 m (Belgrade 2021) NR

See also
List of Serbian records in athletics

References

External links 
 
 

Living people
1996 births
Serbian male shot putters
World Athletics Championships athletes for Serbia
People from Prijepolje
Athletes (track and field) at the 2020 Summer Olympics
Olympic athletes of Serbia
Athletes (track and field) at the 2022 Mediterranean Games
Mediterranean Games medalists in athletics
Mediterranean Games gold medalists for Serbia
Mediterranean Games gold medalists in athletics
21st-century Serbian people
European Athletics Championships medalists